Yuriy Georgiyevich Kutsenko (born 20 May 1967), better known as Gosha Kutsenko, is a Russian actor, producer, singer, poet, and screenwriter. In 2008, he joined the United Russia political party. Kutsenko has appeared in high-profile films such as Mama Don't Cry, Antikiller, Night Watch, Lubov-Morkov, and Echelon Conspiracy.

Selected filmography

References

External links

Gosha Kutsenko in Forbes

1967 births
Living people
Actors from Zaporizhzhia
Russian people of Ukrainian descent
Russian film producers
20th-century Russian male singers
20th-century Russian singers
Russian male poets
Russian screenwriters
Russian male stage actors
Russian male television actors
Russian male voice actors
United Russia politicians
21st-century Russian politicians
Male screenwriters
Moscow Art Theatre School alumni